Almaarad is a notable Thoroughbred race horse owned by Hamdan bin Rashid Al Maktoum, who won a number of stakes races both in Europe and Australia.

Trained in Australia by Colin Hayes, he is best known for his win in the 1989 Cox Plate when ridden by Michael Clarke.

Following a short but successful racing career in Australia which yielded 3 wins from 4 starts he was retired to stud in 1990.

Pedigree

1983 racehorse births
Cox Plate winners
Thoroughbred family 5-h
Racehorses trained in the United Kingdom
Racehorses trained in Australia
Racehorses bred in the United Kingdom